Crotched may refer to:

Crotched Mountain, New Hampshire, United States
Crotched Lake, Nova Scotia, Canada